Brandon Durham, better known by his nickname "The Assassin", is an American streetball player from Oklahoma City, Oklahoma.  Durham played for John Marshall High School although he is best known for his appearance on the ESPN television show "Street Ball – The AND1 Mixtape Tour".  Durham is 6-0" tall, weighs 170 pounds and plays the point guard position.  In the 2005 season of the AND1 Mixtape Tour, Durham competed at the Oklahoma City open run and performed well enough to play in the main game later in the evening. Durham also appears as a character in the AND1 Streetball video game. Durham was offered the opportunity to play for the AND1 team but he rejected it, saying his education was more important than basketball. Durham instead chose to play at Southern Nazarene University in Bethany, Oklahoma.

References 
 "Street Ball - The AND 1 Mix Tape Tour, Season Three". DVD. And 1, 2005.
 "AND 1 Streetball". Ubisoft Entertainment SA, 2006.

External links
Southern Nazarene profile page

See also
2008 NAIA Division I men's basketball tournament
Southern Nazarene Crimson Storm

AND1
Basketball players from Oklahoma
Sportspeople from Oklahoma City
Point guards
Street basketball players
Southern Nazarene Crimson Storm men's basketball players
Living people
American men's basketball players
Year of birth missing (living people)